The pool stage of the 1999–2000 European Challenge Cup.

Pool 1

Pool 2

Pool 3

Pool 4

Pool 5

Pool 6

Pool 7

* Agen deducted two points for fielding non-registered players in two matches.

See also
European Challenge Cup
1999–2000 Heineken Cup

References

pool stage
1999–2000